The Sanford Commercial District is a U.S. Historic District (designated as such on June 15, 1976) located in Sanford, Florida. The district includes parts of 1st, 2nd, and Commercial Streets, between Palmetto and Oak Streets. It contains 29 historic buildings, including the PICO Building at 209 North Oak.

References

External links
 Seminole County listings at National Register of Historic Places

National Register of Historic Places in Seminole County, Florida
Historic districts on the National Register of Historic Places in Florida